Tennessee Christmas may refer to:

Music

Albums
Tennessee Christmas, a 2016 album by Amy Grant
Tennessee Christmas: A Holiday Collection, a 2008 album by Point of Grace
 East Tennessee Christmas, a 1983 album by Chet Atkins

Songs
"Tennessee Christmas" a 1983 song by Amy Grant, also re-recorded by Grant in 2016 for her above mentioned album
2008 cover version of Grant's song by Point of Grace from their above mentioned album
"East Tennessee Christmas" by Chet Atkins from his above mentioned album